The non-marine molluscs of Sudan and South Sudan are a part of the molluscan fauna of the Sudans (wildlife of Sudan, wildlife of South Sudan).

A number of species of non-marine molluscs are found in the wild in the Sudans.

Freshwater gastropods 
Freshwater gastropods in the Sudans include:

Ampullariidae
 Lanistes carinatus (Olivier, 1804)
 Marisa cornuarietis (Linnaeus, 1758)

Paludomidae
 Cleopatra bulimoides (Olivier, 1804)

Thiaridae
 Melanoides tuberculata (O. F. Müller, 1774)

Planorbidae
 Biomphalaria pfeifferi (Krauss, 1848)
 Bulinus forskalii (Ehrenberg, 1831)
 Bulinus truncatus (Audouin, 1827)

Lymnaeidae
 Radix natalensis (Krauss, 1848)

Land gastropods 
Land gastropods in the Sudans include:

Bivalves
Freshwater bivalves in the Sudans include:

See also
Lists of molluscs of surrounding countries:
 List of non-marine molluscs of Egypt, Wildlife of Egypt
 List of non-marine molluscs of Eritrea, Wildlife of Eritrea
 List of non-marine molluscs of Ethiopia, Wildlife of Ethiopia
 List of non-marine molluscs of Kenya, Wildlife of Kenya
 List of non-marine molluscs of Uganda, Wildlife of Uganda
 List of non-marine molluscs of the Democratic Republic of the Congo, Wildlife of the Democratic Republic of the Congo
 List of non-marine molluscs of the Central African Republic, Wildlife of the Central African Republic
 List of non-marine molluscs of Chad, Wildlife of Chad
 List of non-marine molluscs of Libya, Wildlife of Libya

References

Molluscs, Non marine
Molluscs, Non marine

Lists of biota of Sudan
Lists of biota of South Sudan
Sudan
Sudan